"Batter Up" is a 2001 single by Nelly.

Batter up or Batter Up may also refer to:

Baseball
 A baseball term
 Batter-Up Baseball, 1950s/1960s card game
 Batter Up (video game), 1991 Sega Game Gear video game
 Super Batter Up, 1992 Super NES video game
 BatterUP, a 1994 console video game accessory

Television episodes
 "Batter Up" (1991), Back to the Future: The Animated Series
 "Batter Up" (2005), The Closer
 "Batter Up" (2007), Design Squad
 "Batter Up" (2011), American Restoration

Songs
 "Batter Up", 1957 jazz song by Russ Freeman on the album Double Play!
 "Batter Up", 2008 song on the No More Heroes soundtrack
 "Batter Up", 2010 hard rock instrument song by Paul Gilbert on the album Fuzz UniverseOther
 To apply cooking batter
 Batter Up, thoroughbred horse and winner of the Sorority Stakes (1961), Black-Eyed Susan Stakes (1962), and Miss Woodford Stakes (1962) horseraces
 Batter Up Wombat, 2008 children's book by Helen Lester
 Batter Up'', a publication produced by American company Dawn Foods

See also
 Batter (disambiguation)
 Up (disambiguation)